Bijele Strijele (trans. The White Arrows) were a Yugoslav rock band formed in Zagreb in 1961. They were one of the pioneers of the Yugoslav rock scene.

Bijele Strijele were one of first rock bands to be formed in Yugoslavia. The band's debut EP, released in 1963, was the first record released by a Yugoslav rock band. Initially they performed covers of Cliff Richard and the Shadows, and later incorporated covers of the songs by The Beatles and other acts into their repertoire. They were one of the first Yugoslav rock bands to compose and perform their own songs, which brought them nationwide popularity. However, in the second half of the 1960s, with the rising popularity of Yugoslav rhythm and blues bands, Bijele Strijele's popularity declined and they disbanded in 1966.

History

1961-1966
Bijele Strijele were formed in the summer of 1961 by young men who met at a youth work action of building the floodbanks on the Sava river. The original lineup of the band consisted of Ranko Bačić (vocals), Milan Gelb (vocals), Vladimir Rubčić (vocals), Ivica Banfić (guitar), Ignac Pavlović (guitar), Zlatko Tretinjak (rhythm guitar), Željko Ilić (bass guitar) and Predrag "Doda" Drezga (drums). At the time of the formation, they were one of the first rock bands formed in Yugoslavia; some sources cite them as the first rock band formed in Zagreb, or even in Yugoslavia, but others cite the Zagreb band Sjene (The Shadows) as the oldest Yugoslav band. The band members originally chose the name Kramp (Pickaxe), as they met on a work action, but later opted for the name Bijele Strijele. The band had their debut performance in Zagreb in the autumn of 1961, gaining large attention of the public. Soon after Drezga was replaced by Mario "Braco" Škrinjarić.

The band initially performed covers of songs by Cliff Richard and the Shadows, and later, with the appearance and rising popularity of The Beatles, Bijele Strijele incorporated their song into the repertoire. Initially they performed on high school dances, in the 
Zagreb club Glazbenjak (Music Club), in the Zagreb hotel Esplanada, in the Opatija hotel Zagreb, and on several occasions even at the prestigious Zagreb Music Institute. At the end of 1962, before the recording of the band's debut EP, Pavlović and Ilić left the band. Pavlović was replaced by Zlatko Sović, Banfić moved to bass guitar and the band was joined by keyboardist Dražen Susić. The EP Svi trče oko Sue (Everybody's Runnin' around Sue) was released in January 1963 through record label Jugoton. The EP was the first record released by a Yugoslav rock band. The title track was a cover of Dion song "Runaround Sue", and the EP also featured the songs "The Wanderer" (a cover of Dion song), "Rastanak" ("The Parting", a cover of the song "Sealed with a Kiss") and the instrumental track "Strijele" ("Arrows"), composed by Banfić and Tretinjak.

At the beginning of 1963, at the Zagreb Festival the band won the second place by the choice of the audience. On the festival they performed the song "Ti si moje proljeće" ("You Are My Spring"), and also performed as the backing band for the vocal quartet 4M in the song "Platno, boje, kist i twist" ("Canvas, Paint, Brush and Twist"). Both songs were publish on a split 7" single, and the song "Ti si moje proljeće" was also released on the festival official compilation album Zagreb 63. The band's performance on the festival saw large attention of the media, as they were the first Yugoslav rock band to perform on a pop festival in Yugoslavia. The performance saw very negative reactions in a part of the press. At the time Bačić left the band, and was replaced by vocalist Ivan Balić. The band's following release was a 7" single featuring two instrumental tracks, "Divan krajolik", a cover of The Shadows song "Wonderful Land", and "Šeći, ne trči", a cover of The Ventures version of the song "Walk, Don't Run". However, at this time the band also started incorporating more of their original material into their set lists, which brought them nationwide popularity.

The band's second EP record, Prilika za ljubav (A Chance for Love), released in 1963, featured the song "Lađica" ("Little Boat"), written by famous Soviet composer Vasily Solovyov-Sedoi. In 1962 he heard Bijele Strijele perform in hotel Zagreb in Opatija, he liked their performance and wrote the song "Lađica" specially for them. The EP title track was a cover of Gene McDaniels song "Take a Chance on Love", and the EP also featured the song "Doviđenja" ("So Long", a cover of Del Shannon song "So Long Baby") and the song "Madison". On their following release, a 7" single released also in 1963, they released the songs "Mrzim taj dan" ("I Hate that Day"), which was a cover of Ray Charles song "Unchain My Heart" and "Ritam i želje" ("Rhythm and Wishes"). "Mrzim taj dan" featured an arrangement which was at the time very original: it opens with a sound of church organ. During 1963 the band was hired by the sewing machine factory Bagat to record a promotional single. The single, featuring the songs "Ana" and "Maja", was not sold, but was given by the factory as promotional material. In 1963 the band also played as the backing band for Tereza Kesovija on her EP Vrijeme za twist (Time for Twist).

During 1964 the band performed regularly on dances held in Zagreb clubs Palace and Glazbenjak, held several concerts in Vienna, Austria, played as the backing band on Karlo Metikoš's Yugoslav tour and played as the backing band on 4M EP Dolazi dan (The Day Is Coming). In 1964 they were proclaimed the second best Yugoslav band (behind Crveni Koralji) by the music magazine Ritam. During this year the band released their last record, the EP Voli me (Love Me Do). The EP featured covers of The Beatles songs: a cover of "Love Me Do" entitled "Voli me", a cover of "From Me to You" entitled "Zbog nje" ("Because of Her"), a cover of "Please Please Me" entitled "Oprosti što sam opet tu" ("Forgive Me for Being Here Again") and a cover of "I Want to Hold Your Hand" entitled "Ljubav nas čeka" ("Love is Waiting for Us"). At the end of 1964 Banfić and Škrinjarić left Bijele Strijele and were replaced by former Bezimeni members Janko Mlinarić "Truli" and Radovan Krajnović respectively. However, with the rising popularity of Yugoslav bands which performed rhythm and blues, the band failed to sustain their popularity and ended their activity in the spring of 1966.

Post breakup
Šrkinjarić died in 1968 at the age of 33. Drezga died in 1969 at the age of 36.

In 1994 all songs recorded by the band were released on the compilation album Izvorne snimke (1962.-1964.) (Original Recordings (1962-1964)) by Croatia Records.

Discography

EPs
Svi trče oko Sue (1963)
Prilika za ljubav (1963)
Voli me (1964)

Singles
"Ti si moje proljeće" / "Platno, boje, kist i twist" (split single, with 4M; 1963)
"Divan krajolik" / "Šeći, ne trči" (1963)
"Mrzim taj dan" / "Ritam želje" (1963)
"Ana" / "Maja" (1963)

Compilations
Izvorne snimke (1962.-1964.) (1994)

References

External links 
 Bijele Strijele at Discogs

Croatian rock music groups
Yugoslav rock music groups
Instrumental rock musical groups
Beat groups
Musical groups established in 1961
Musical groups disestablished in 1966